Jiang Zhuyun (20 August 1920 – 14 November 1949) was a Chinese communist resistance fighter and revolutionary martyr. She is the basis of the character of Jiang Xueqin, or "Sister Jiang" in the semi-fictional novel Red Crag.

Life
She was born Jiang Zhujun in Jiangjiawan, Dashanpu, Zigong, Sichuan province. She moved after a drought struck their area and her mother asked for help from her brother who lived in Chongqing. When her grandmother died they were able to move out of her uncle's house. He was well off, whilst her family had difficulty living on her father's wage and her mother's job. Her father sent money home as he was a sailor, Jiang attended a church school and in 1939 started to attend university. She joined the communist party.

She was assigned an undercover role where she was required to appear as the wife of Peng Pongwu. He already had a wife called Tan Zhenglun and because of this they were unsuccessfully in keeping their relationship professional.

In 1944 the Communist party arranged for her to attend Sichuan University. There she worked secretly and she not only studied Russian but she read Russian media and books. She was allowed to marry Peng Pongwu in 1945. The following year their son was born.

Peng was leading a group of guerrillas when he was killed in 1948 and she took on his role. She left her son with Peng's first wife and led the group. Another revolutionary was captured and gave her name to her captors.

She was arrested in Wanxian and then imprisoned in Zhazidong Concentration Camp. She was tortured but she kept all her knowledge secret. She did manage to send out a letter, which is now at the Three Gorges Museum in Chongqing. A quote from it says "Tortures are too small tasks for the Communists. Bamboo sticks are made of bamboo, but the will of the Communists is made of iron and steel". The letter is said to have inspired many to make generous donations to the Communist Party of China.

Literary and artistic representations 
'Sister Jiang', a key character in the popular novel Red Crag (1961), is based on Jiang Zhuyun. The character also features in many adaptations of the novel, including:

 Sister Jiang (1964), a Chinese-language western-style opera
 Life in Eternal Flame (1965), a film directed by Shui Hua
 Sister Jiang (2010), a CCTV-1 television series

References

1920 births
1949 deaths
People from Zigong
People executed by the Republic of China
Chinese communists